"Flickan på min gata" is a song by Swedish singer Benjamin Ingrosso. It was released as digital download and for streaming on 11 January 2021 by TEN Music Group as the lead single from his second studio album  En gång i tiden (del 1). The song peaked at number nine on the Swedish Singles Chart. The song was written by Benjamin Ingrosso and Niklas Wahlgren.

Background
Ingrosso was between 12 and 13 years old when he wrote the song with his uncle Niklas Wahlgren.

Track listing

Personnel
Credits adapted from Tidal.
 Anders Glenmark – producer
 Benjamin Ingrosso – producer, composer, lyricist
 Hampus Lindvall – producer
 Niklas Wahlgren – composer, lyricist

Charts

Certifications

References

2021 songs
2021 singles
Benjamin Ingrosso songs
Swedish-language songs
Songs written by Benjamin Ingrosso